The 2008 Rugby League World Cup was the thirteenth staging of the Rugby League World Cup since its inauguration in 1954, and the first since the 2000 tournament. The tournament was held in Australia from 26 October, culminating in the final between Australia and New Zealand on 22 November.

The tournament was the fourth time that the World Cup was held in Australia, the first being in 1957. The tournament was won by New Zealand, who defeated Australia 34–20 in the final in one of the greatest upsets in the history of the sport. The tournament featured the best ten teams around the globe which were split into three groups. A total of eighteen matches took place in twelve different venues across four Australian states. The tournament ended a year of celebrations commemorating the centenary of the game in the southern hemisphere and was part of the Festival of World Cups.

Host selection
The thirteenth Cup was scheduled to be held in Australia in 2004, however the lack of international success by Great Britain and New Zealand after the 2000 World Cup and the rise of the Tri-Nations tournament meant that it was delayed for a further four years. The Rugby League International Federation officially announced this tournament on 6 May 2006, with further details on scheduling and dates following on 19 April 2007.

Format

Qualification 

The hosts, Australia, were given automatic entry into the World Cup, along with New Zealand, England, France and Papua New Guinea. The five remaining places in the World Cup were determined by qualification rounds. Two European rounds and Pacific, Atlantic and Repêchage rounds were scheduled.

Tonga and Fiji became the first two nations to qualify after Tonga defeated Samoa 18–10 in Leeds on 22 October, forcing Samoa to enter the repêchage. In the European Group Two, Ireland drew 16–16 with Lebanon to ensure qualification, while Lebanon were forced to enter the repêchage. The final automatic place went to Scotland, who defeated Wales 37–32 on aggregate after two legs. Wales then faced Lebanon in the repêchage semi-final, where they lost in a surprise 50–26 defeat, to knock them out of World Cup Qualifying. Lebanon then faced Samoa, who beat USA 42–10 in the first semi-final, on 14 November for the final qualifying position. The game was won by Samoa, 38–16, and so they booked the tenth and final place. Many qualification matches were broadcast live by Sky Sports in the United Kingdom and New Zealand, whilst BigPondTV broadcast matches online for other fans around the world.

Draw 
The draw, after being confirmed by the RLIF on 19 April 2007, involved three groups. The first group was made up of four teams; Australia, England, New Zealand and Papua New Guinea. Whilst the other two groups involved three teams each. The semi finals were made up of the first three teams in the first group and the winner of a playoff between the winners of the second and third groups.

The draw was put into doubt after the Papua New Guinea team claimed that it was unfair to them and threatened to boycott the tournament should it not be changed. Marcus Bai, former Papua New Guinean winger and captain, said:

Fortunately for the tournament, this separate island competition did not eventuate. Papua New Guinea still remained upset with the draw, seeing it as a huge challenge but one which would have seen them be rewarded if they had won. The draw was finalised on 4 October 2007.

The first match took place in Townsville between England and Papua New Guinea, although the official opening ceremony of the competition occurred before the Australia and New Zealand match the following day in Sydney. The final took place at Lang Park (Suncorp Stadium) in Brisbane.

Teams received 2 points for a win, and 1-point for a draw. This meant that, unlike in the Australasian National Rugby League, there was no "golden point" rule enforced. In group stages, if two teams had the same number of points then positions were determined on points difference, the number of points scored minus the number of points conceded.

After group matches were completed, a match featuring the second placed teams in Group B and Group C took place with the winner receiving 7th place. Similarly the third placed teams in Group B and Group C played off for 9th place. It was believed that these results were to be taken into account in the 2009 RLIF World Rankings.

Squads

Each nation competing in the tournament named 24-man squads in the weeks prior to the group stage commencing.

Venues 
Due to Rugby League World Cup rules prohibiting the use of commercial venue names, all venues were known by their non-commercial names, e.g. Suncorp Stadium was known as Lang Park during the tournament. Lang Park would also host the World Cup Final.

Officiating 
Six referees from four countries controlled matches in the tournament. These four nations also provided touch judges while England and Australia provided the video referees. In support of the Australian National Breast Cancer Foundation, the referees wore pastel pink shirts while officiating matches to raise awareness. The shirts, which carried the NBCF logo on the collar, were signed by the team captains at each World Cup game and were later auctioned off with the proceeds going to the NBCF.

Referees
  Thierry Alibert (France)
  Tony Archer (Australia)
  Steve Ganson (England)
  Shayne Hayne (Australia)
  Ashley Klein (England)
  Leon Williamson (New Zealand)

Video referees
  Steve Clark (Australia)
  Phil Cooley (Australia)
  Steve Ganson (England)
  Ashley Klein (England)
  Paul Simpkins (Australia)

Touch judges
  Adam Burns (New Zealand)
  Steve Chiddy (Australia)
  James Child (England)
  Tony De Las Hera (Australia)
  Paul Holland (Australia)
  Jose Perrara (France)
  Bernard Sutton (Australia)
  Gerard Sutton (Australia)
  Russell Turner (Australia)

Opening ceremony 
On Sunday night, 26 October, the Sydney Football Stadium hosted the Opening Ceremony of the World Cup. It started with Greg Inglis reciting a speech about "Playing Fair". Following Inglis' speech there was an Aboriginal Smoking ceremony to welcome all the athletes and participants. This included a rather large sized Rainbow Serpent which represented the Aboriginal Dreamtime. The last part of the ceremony involved a performance of the Rugby League World Cup anthem "Hero" by Natalie Bassingthwaighte. A curtain raiser to the Australia vs. New Zealand match included an Indigenous Australian squad playing against New Zealand Māori which featured several prominent NRL players and rising stars, including Chris Sandow, Wairangi Koopu, Preston Campbell, Sam Thaiday, Shaun Kenny-Dowall and Carl Webb.

As part of the official opening of the World Cup on 26 October, an exhibition game was played between an Aboriginal selection and a New Zealand Māori side.

Group stage 
The 2008 Rugby League World Cup's eighteen matches were played during October and November in various locations throughout the east coast of Australia. The tournament's teams were divided into three pool groups. The teams finishing highest amongst those groups progressed to the play-offs.

All teams from group A (shaded in green) with the exception of the bottom qualifying team progressed to the semi-finals, the other two groups the top finisher progressed to a playoff match, in which the winner would qualify to the semi-finals.

Group A

Group B

Group C

Knockout stage 

The top three teams from pool A advanced to the semi-finals, while the top teams from pools B and C played off in the qualifying final to decide the fourth spot in the semi-finals.

7th place play-off

9th place play-off

Quarter-final

Semi-finals

Final: Australia vs New Zealand

Statistics

Try scorers 
7 tries
  Billy Slater

6 tries
  Greg Inglis

5 tries
  Akuila Uate
  Damien Blanch

4 tries

  Joel Monaghan
  David Williams
  Lance Hohaia
  Jerome Ropati
  Manu Vatuvei

3 tries

  Scott Prince
  Johnathan Thurston
  Martin Gleeson
  Lee Smith
  Jarryd Hayne
  Jérôme Guisset
  Pat Richards
  Sam Perrett
  Michael Jennings

2 tries

  Israel Folau
  Anthony Laffranchi
  Darren Lockyer
  Brent Tate
  Rob Burrow
  Ade Gardner
  Danny McGuire
  Jayson Bukuya
  Semi Tadulala
  John Wilson
  Adam Blair
  Simon Mannering
  Benji Marshall
  George Keppa
  George Carmont
  Francis Meli
  Misi Taulapapa
  Ben Te'o
  Matt Utai
  Nigel Vagana
  Jon Steel
  Oliver Wilkes
  Etuate Uaisele

1 try

  Paul Gallen
  Anthony Tupou
  Jamie Peacock
  Mickey Higham
  James Roby
  Christophe Moly
  Sébastien Planas
  Sébastien Raguin
  Jared Taylor
  Iowane Divavesi
  Semisi Tora
  Wes Naiqama
  Liam Finn
  Simon Finnigan
  Sean Gleeson
  Scott Grix
  Michael Platt
  Greg Eastwood
  David Fa'alogo
  Nathan Fien
  Bronson Harrison
  Issac Luke
  Sika Manu
  Jason Nightingale
  Paul Aiton
  Jason Chan
  Rod Griffin
  Menzie Yere
  Joseph Paulo
  Frank Puletua
  Ben Roberts
  David Solomona
  Paddy Coupar
  Michael Robertson
  Tevita Leo-Latu
  Feleti Mateo
  Eddie Paea
  Fetuli Talanoa
  Esikeli Tonga
  Tony Williams

Attendances

Critical reception 
Due to the generally poor response of the 2000 World Cup, there were several key criticisms of the tournament before any matches had kicked off. The RLIF were forced to defend the credibility of the tournament in October 2007 after New Zealand, one of the favourites for the competition, were heavily beaten in a Test match 58–0 in Wellington against Australia. Another concern was whether there would be enough competitiveness throughout the ten teams, with some fans worried about the possibility of too many one-sided matches, which was a common sight in the Group Stages of the 2000 tournament.

Ricky Stuart, coach of the Australian team, was reported to be so incensed by his team's defeat in the final that he verbally attacked Geoff Carr, the chief executive of Australian Rugby League, claiming that tournament organisers and match officials conspired to cause the Australian loss. The next morning he had a chance meeting with Ashley Klein, who refereed the final, and Stuart Cummings, the Rugby Football League's director of match officials, at their hotel. He reportedly abused both officials in front of a number of witnesses, calling Klein a cheat, and behaved in an aggressive and physically intimidating manner. Stuart later apologised for his behaviour and resigned from his post.

Marketing

Branding

The World Cup's "Heroes Here 08" promotional campaign was launched at the Sydney Opera House on 6 May 2008. At the launch, Paul Kind, the World Cup Director of Marketing, explained, "Heroes Here 08 underlines that fact that the international game, and particularly this tournament, will bring out the best in every player who takes part. It will create heroes."

Natalie Bassingthwaighte recorded an "Australian version" of the Mariah Carey song "Hero" which accompanied the "Heroes 08" promotional video and other World Cup advertising. The World Cup Opening Ceremony featured a live performance of the song by Bassingthwaighte.

Filming of visuals for the promotional video began in Leeds during the worldwide ticketing launch for the event in November 2007.

Advertising agency MJW, celebrity photographer Garry Heery and production company Engine worked together to combine the latest digital animation with a dark and determined set that highlighted the passion players feel in representing their country on the international stage.

The Heroes campaign featured Mark Gasnier (Australia), Roy Asotasi (New Zealand), Rob Burrow (England), Keith Peters (PNG), Waisale Sukanaveita (Fiji), Nigel Vagana (Samoa), Jerome Guisset (France), Lee Paterson (Scotland), Stuart Littler (Ireland) and Lopini Paea (Tonga). Gasnier was later removed from some of the promotional material after he left the sport mid-season and was replaced by Darren Lockyer.

The video also appeared in the video game Rugby League 2: World Cup Edition, which featured a world cup mode based on the event.

Ticketing

Tickets for Australian residents went on sale 7 November 2007 and internationally on 18 February. However tickets were not distributed until 3 March. Ticketek were announced as the official ticketing agency for the competition, selling tickets for all matches. Ticketmaster and Pilbeam Theatre were selling tickets to the Telstra Dome and Browne Park matches respectively.

The World Cup Final sold out months in advance.

Sponsorship
The Official Sponsors of the Rugby League World Cup 2008 were:
 Jetstar: Official Airline
 Foster's: Official Beer
 Bundaberg Rum: Official Spirit
 AAMI: Official referee sponsor
 Telstra: Official Telecommunications sponsor
 Gillette: Official Male products
 Holiday Inn: Official Accommodation Supplier
 Coca-Cola: Official Soft drink
 Harvey Norman: Official retailer
 Bic: Official stationery

Broadcasting

Television 

The 2008 World Cup had 26 separate television deals taking coverage to 127 countries and generating more than $20 million income. A global television audience of 19.2 million made it the most widely broadcast event in the game's history.

Channel 9 broadcast all Group A matches and the Knockout Stage matches in Australia. Fox Sports broadcast all Group B and C matches plus Ranking Stage matches live. In the United Kingdom, Sky Sports broadcast all matches live, meaning that all were shown in the morning and some as early as 06:00 am with highlights being shown on the BBC. Sky Sport showed all games live across New Zealand. Mai TV broadcast all matches live in Papua New Guinea, Fiji, Samoa, Cook Islands and the Solomon Islands. Orange Sport provided coverage of all matches live in France.

Coverage of the competition also extended to countries not taking part. Showtime showed all matches live across the Middle East. G offered coverage of all games in many countries in Africa. Astro showed all matches in Malaysia, and ESPN360 showed all matches in the United States. In Brazil, some matches were broadcast by Bandsports.

The only participating country with no television coverage of the matches was Tonga; the RLIF were hoping to secure a deal before the World Cup started, but this never happened.

BigPondTV, an online television station, broadcast all matches live and also repeated matches. This service was available to everyone for free.

Radio 

 UK – BBC Radio 5 Live and its sister station BBC Radio 5 Live Sports Extra broadcast selected games.
 UK – some non-rights holders used Australian freelance reporter Tim Stackpool to report on games for UK broadcasters. An extensive archive can be heard here: RLWC Archive
 AUS – ABC and 2GB Radio broadcast selected games.
 NZ – Radio Sport broadcast the Kiwi's games, including the Kiwi's victory in the final.

References

External links 
 Official Website
 2008 World Cup at rugbyleagueproject.org
 2008 World Cup at 188-rugby-league.co.uk
 "World Cup Moved To End of Season", BBC website. Retrieved 4 May 2006.
 "RLIF Meeting", Rugby League European Federation website. Retrieved 8 May 2006
 "McDonald defends World Cup", BBC website. Retrieved 6 May 2006.
 "Lewis backs Australia for World Cup", telegraph.co.uk website. Retrieved 8 May 2006